The Battle of Cadoret took place on the moorland of Cadoret near Lanouée (commune of Les Forges) in 1345 as part of the War of Succession of Brittany (1341–1365).

Context 
The battle occurred after the victorious siege of the city of Quimper by Charles of Blois in 1344.

Development 
Thomas Dagworth, was en route to Ploërmel through Oust à Cadoret. Opposite, Charles of Blois and his army arrived by the Landes de Cadoret. The two forces engaged and the fight lasted the entire afternoon. Caught under a rain of arrows from Welsh archers, the army of Charles suffered many losses.

Aftermath 
The French captains Galois de la Heuse and Péan of Fontenay were made prisoners and Charles abandoned the field.

References 

 Y. Gicquel Argentré (B. d'), Histoire de Bretagne, 1618.

1345 in England
1345 in France
Cadoret 1345
Cadoret
History of Morbihan
Cadoret
War of the Breton Succession